The Christmas Island Women's Association (CIWA) is a human rights organisation in Christmas Island. Established in 1989 it advocates for women's rights to the Australian government and runs community-based activities for women and children.

Background 
The Christmas Island Women's Association was established in 1989 by nurse Norah Koh, in order to promote and support the interests of women in the territory. It is affiliated with Associated Country Women of the World. Members of the association are of Chinese, Malay and European Australian descent.

Activities 
In 1989 the CIWA founded the Women's Refuge Centre, in 1990 the Childcare Centre, and in 1991 an early childhood programme. In 1992 the CIWA founded a music school and have sponsored musicians to work with young people. 

The CIWA has expressed concern that access services on Christmas Island are not equal to those on mainland Australia and have particularly cited the fact that although research is commissioned it is not disseminated to communities. They have also supported calls for the role of Administrator on Christmas Island (a role appointed by the Australian government) to be abolished and the Administrator's duties be merged with those of the locally-elected Shire President.

The CIWA has  lobbied the Australian government who administer the island for improvement in a number of health related issues including: disability care and support for carers; asbestos removal; anti-smoking support; the installation of a mammogram machine on the island in 2006. They have also been outspoken against the lack of residential care for older people on the island. The association has worked with Keep Australia Beautiful, running workshops on waste reduction.

Notable people 

 Norah Koh - President (1989 - ?).
 Regine Andersen - Secretary.

References

External links 
 Christmas Island Women's Association Moon Festival

Christmas Island
Women's organisations based in Australia
1989 establishments in Australia